Ennis is the county town of County Clare, Ireland.

Ennis may also refer to:

Places
Ennis, Kentucky U.S.
Ennis, Montana, U.S.
Ennis, Texas, U.S.
Ennis, West Virginia, U.S.
Ennis House, a building in Los Angeles, California, U.S.

 Historical
Ennis (Parliament of Ireland constituency)
Ennis (UK Parliament constituency)

Other uses
Ennis (surname)
Murder of Ennis Cosby, the son of entertainer Bill Cosby
Ennis Del Mar, character from the story "Brokeback Mountain"

See also
Ennes (disambiguation)
Enniskillen, county town of County Fermanagh, Northern Ireland
Innis (disambiguation)